Duanqiao is a town in Guanling Buyei and Miao Autonomous County, Anshun, Guizhou province, China. , it had 15 villages under its administration.

See also 
 List of township-level divisions of Guizhou

References 

Towns in Guizhou
Guanling Buyei and Miao Autonomous County